History of Uppland, a historical province of Sweden.

Cities
The chartered Cities in Uppland and their history.

Stockholm

Stockholm, which is the capital of Sweden, was founded approximately 1250. It is divided between two provinces, where the southern half lies in Södermanland and the northern half in Uppland.

Uppsala
The city of Uppsala wasn't chartered until 1286, however it possesses a long pre-history.

Other cities
Enköping (approximately 1300)
Lidingö (1926)
Norrtälje (1622)
Sigtuna (approximately 990)
Solna (1943)
Sundbyberg (1927)
Vaxholm (1652)
Öregrund (1491)
Östhammar (approximately 1300)

See also
History of Sweden
Provinces of Sweden
Lands of Sweden

Uppland